Yarek Gasiorowski Hernandis (born 12 January 2005) is a Spanish professional footballer who plays as a centre-back for the Valencia Mestalla.

Club career
Gasiorowski trialled for Valencia in 2012, and joined their academy shortly thereafter. On 4 August 2022, he signed a professional contract with the club for 3+2 years. In September 2022, he was named by English newspaper The Guardian as one of the best players born in 2005 worldwide.

International career
Born in Spain, Gasiorowski was born to a Polish father and Spanish mother. He was called up to the Poland U17s and Spain U17s at the same time, and chose to play for Spain. He was called up to the Spain U19s in September 2022.

Playing style
Formerly a full-back, Gasiorowski is a centre-back that likes to "bring the ball out from the back, tends to win aerial challenges, likes to be physical when needed and always close to opposition forwards.” He is a long throw specialist.

References

External links
 
 
 

2005 births
Living people
People from Ribera Baixa
Spanish footballers
Spain youth international footballers
Spanish people of Polish descent
Association football defenders
Valencia CF Mestalla footballers